Fervent Records is a contemporary Christian music record label based in Nashville, Tennessee. Fervent was bought by Word Records in 2005.

Current artists 
 Chris August
 Francesca Battistelli
 Big Daddy Weave
 Everfound
 For King & Country
 Dara Maclean
 Stars Go Dim

Former artists 
 BarlowGirl (disbanded)
 By the Tree (active/unsigned)
 Cadia (disbanded)
 Group 1 Crew (disbanded)
 Exit East (disbanded)
 Inhabited (independent/active)
 Andrew Peterson (active with Centricity Music)
 Jill Phillips (active/independent)
 pureNRG (disbanded)
 Sidewalk Prophets (active with Curb Records/Word)

See also 
 List of Christian record labels

References 

American record labels
Christian record labels
Rock record labels
Labels distributed by Warner Music Group
Record labels established in 2001